Phil Campbell and the Bastard Sons is a Welsh rock band established in 2016 by longtime Motörhead guitarist Phil Campbell, following the 2015 death of Motörhead frontman Lemmy.

History

Debut EP (2016)
In November 2016, his new project Phil Campbell and the Bastard Sons released their first recording, a self-titled EP. The band has subsequently performed in supporting slots with Hawkwind, Guns N' Roses, Saxon and Airbourne.

Debut album (2017)
In August 2017, Phil Campbell and the Bastard Sons announced that they were to start recording their debut album. On 26 October 2017, Phil Campbell And The Bastard Sons announced the title of the debut album as The Age Of Absurdity, which was released on 26 January 2018 on Nuclear Blast Records. The album was produced by Romesh Dodangoda. At the 2018 Metal Hammer Awards ceremony in Germany, it won Best Debut Album.

The band's line up for the album features Phil and his three sons, together with former Attack! Attack! vocalist from South Wales Neil Starr:
Phil Campbell – rhythm guitar
Todd Campbell – lead guitar, harmonica
Dane Campbell – drums
Tyla Campbell – bass
Neil Starr (Attack! Attack!, Dopamine) – vocals
Romesh Dodangoda – percussion and keyboards on "Into the Dark"
Dave Brock – guitar and vocals on "Silver Machine"

Debut single (2018)
On 21 April 2018, Phil Campbell and the Bastard Sons released a cover of "Silver Machine" for Record Store Day. The track was previously available as a bonus track on some CD versions of The Age of Absurdity. The band completed a headlining tour of the UK and Europe in the winter of 2018.

We're the Bastards
On 4 September 2020, the band announced on social media that a new album We're the Bastards would be released on 13 November via Nuclear Blast. The album was recorded in 2020 and produced by Todd Campbell in Wales and mixed by Soren Anderson. Vocalist Neil Starr said: "It's definitely great to know that we have an audience now. We know there are people that want to hear it, but the truth is that we just had fun with it. Once again, we made the record we wanted to make and it's been really exciting. It was awesome to take our minds off everything and just concentrate on recording a kick ass album for the fans to enjoy."

On 2 June 2021, the band announced they had parted ways with vocalist Neil Starr.

On 18 January 2022 the band announced that Joel Peters had been made a permanent member of the band.

Band members
Current line-up
 Phil Campbell – guitar (2016–present)
 Todd Campbell – guitar, harmonica (2016–present)
 Tyla Campbell – bass (2016–present)
 Dane Campbell – drums (2016–present)
 Joel Peters – lead vocals (2021–present)

Former members
 Neil Starr – lead vocals (2016–2021)

Discography
 Phil Campbell and the Bastard Sons (EP) (2016)
 The Age of Absurdity (2018)
 We're the Bastards (2020)

References

External links
 

2016 establishments in Wales
Welsh heavy metal musical groups
Welsh hard rock musical groups
Nuclear Blast artists
Musical groups established in 2016
Musical quartets